GVK may refer to:
 GVK (conglomerate), an Indian conglomerate
 Giravanz Kitakyushu, a Japanese football club
 Grama Vikas Kendra, of the Mahatma Gandhi University
 Godzilla vs. Kong, a 2021 monster film